Holly Happy Days is the 12th studio album and first holiday album by Indigo Girls, released on October 12, 2010 by Vanguard Records.

Track listing
 "I Feel the Christmas Spirit" (Joe Isaacs)
 "It Really Is (A Wonderful Life)" (Chely Wright)
 "O Holy Night" (John S. Dwight)
 "Your Holiday Song" (Emily Saliers)
 "I'll Be Home for Christmas" (Buck Ram, Kim Gannon, Walter Kent)
 "Mistletoe" (Amy Ray)
 "Peace Child" (Shirley Murray/Bernadette Farrell)
 "The Wonder Song" (Amy Ray)
 "In the Bleak Midwinter" (Traditional)
 "Happy Joyous Hanukkah" (Woody Guthrie)
 "Angels We Have Heard on High" (Traditional)
 "There's Still My Joy" (Beth Nielsen Chapman, Melissa Manchester, Matt Rollings)

Personnel
Indigo Girls
Amy Ray – vocals, acoustic and electric guitar, mandolin
Emily Saliers – vocals, acoustic guitar, nylon string acoustic guitar, ukulele

Additional musicians
Luke Bulla – fiddle, mandolin, rhythm acoustic guitar
Jim Brock – percussion, finger cymbals
Alison Brown – banjo, piccolo banjo
Brandi Carlile – guest vocals
Victor Krauss – bass
Mary Gauthier – guest vocals
Janis Ian – guest vocals
Carol Isaacs – accordion, piano, harmonium
Lloyd Maines – pedal steel and dobro
John Painter – electric guitar
Don Saliers – piano
Julie Wolf – guest vocals and additional vocal arrangement

Production
Peter Collins – production
Denise Plumb – art design
Trina Shoemaker – mixing

Indigo Girls albums
2010 Christmas albums
Albums produced by Peter Collins (record producer)
Christmas albums by American artists
Folk rock Christmas albums
Vanguard Records albums
Covers albums